The 1939 Santa Clara Broncos football team represented Santa Clara University as an independent during the 1939 college football season. In their fourth season under head coach Buck Shaw, the Broncos compiled a 5–1–3 record, outscored opponents by a total of 117 to 40, and were ranked No. 14 in the final AP Poll.

After going winless in its first three games (one loss and two ties), the team went undefeated in the final six games, including victories over Purdue, Stanford, and Michigan State, and a scoreless tie with No. 11 UCLA.

Santa Clara center John Schiechl was a consensus pick on the 1939 College Football All-America Team. End Bill Anahu was named to the second team by the International News Service. Schiechl and Anahu were also both first-team picks on the 1939 All-Pacific Coast football team.

Schedule

References

Santa Clara
Santa Clara Broncos football seasons
Santa Clara Broncos football